Goldberg is a surname of German or Yiddish origin, meaning 'gold mountain', which is common among Ashkenazi Jews. Notable people with the surname include:

Entertainment
 Adam Goldberg (born 1970), American actor
 Adam F. Goldberg (born 1976), American screenwriter and producer
 Andrew Goldberg (director) (born 1968), American film producer/director
 Andrew Goldberg (writer) (born 1978), American television writer
 Daniel Goldberg (producer), Canadian film producer and writer
 Eric Goldberg (animator) (born 1955), American animator
 Eric Goldberg (game designer) (born 1959), American designer of board, role-playing, and computer games
 Evan Goldberg (born 1982), Canadian screenwriter, film producer and director
 Gary David Goldberg (1944–2013), American writer and producer for television and film
 Gina Goldberg (born 1963), Finnish model, actress and singer
 Marc Goldberg (playwright) (born 1968), French playwright and theatre director
 Marc Wallice (born Marc Stephen Goldberg, 1959), American porn actor
 Mike Goldberg (born 1964), American sportscaster
 Rube Goldberg (1883–1970), American cartoonist
 Sarah Goldberg (born 1985), Canadian actress
 Whoopi Goldberg (born 1955), American actress

Music 
 Aaron Goldberg (born 1974), American pianist
 Barry Goldberg (born 1942), American blues musician 
 Ben Goldberg (born 1959), American clarinetist 
 Johann Gottlieb Goldberg (1727–1756), German harpsichordist and composer of the late Baroque period
 Reiner Goldberg (born 1939), German opera singer (heroic tenor)

Politics
 Alan Goldberg (judge) (1940–2016), Federal Court of Australia judge
 Arthur Goldberg (1908–1990), U.S. Secretary of Labor, Supreme Court Justice, and Ambassador to the United Nations
 Daniel Goldberg (politician) (born 1965), French Socialist politician
 Karl Raimund Goldberg (1836–1897), Mayor of Varnsdorf, Member of the Bohemian Diet
 Marilyn Goldberg, Manitoba judge

Science
 Aaron Goldberg (1917–2014), American botanist
 Abraham Goldberg (1923–2007), British professor of medicine
 Adele Goldberg (computer scientist) (born 1945), American computer scientist who wrote or co-wrote books on the programming language Smalltalk-80
 Adele Goldberg (linguist) (born 1963), American researcher in the field of linguistics
Alexander Goldberg (1906–1985), Israeli chemical engineer and ex-president of the Technion – Israel Institute of Technology
 Anatolii Goldberg (1930–2008), Soviet-Israeli mathematician
 Andrew J Goldberg (born 1970), British consultant orthopaedic surgeon
 Andrew V. Goldberg (born 1960), American computer scientist
 David Goldberg (psychiatrist), British academic and social psychiatrist
 David E. Goldberg (born 1953), American computer scientist
 Deborah Goldberg, American ecologist
 Elkhonon Goldberg (born 1946), Latvia-born American neuropsychologist and cognitive neuroscientist
 Emanuel Goldberg (1881–1970), Israeli cinema pioneer, computer pioneer, and inventor in photography
 Irma Goldberg (1871), Russian-born German organic chemist
 Joshua N. Goldberg (1925–2020), American theoretical physicist
 Leo Goldberg (1913–1987), American astronomer
 Lewis Goldberg (born 1932), American personality psychologist and a professor emeritus
 Murray Goldberg (born 1962), Canadian e-learning pioneer
 Nieca Goldberg (born 1957), American cardiologist
 Paul Goldberg (geologist), American geologist
 Pinelopi Koujianou Goldberg, Greek-American economist and former chief economist of the World Bank

Sports
 Aaron Goldberg (golfer) (born 1985), American professional golfer
 Adam Goldberg (American football) (born 1980), American football player (St. Louis Rams)
 Benny Goldberg (1918–2001), Polish bantamweight boxer
 Bill Goldberg (born 1966), American professional wrestler, film actor and former American football player (Atlanta Falcons)
 Brad Goldberg (born 1990), American baseball pitcher
Chelsey Goldberg (born 1993), American ice hockey player
 Dan Goldberg (tennis) (born 1967), American tennis player
 Jared Goldberg (born 1991), American Olympic skier
 Les Goldberg (1918–1985), English footballer
 Mark Goldberg (football manager), English football manager and businessman
 Marshall Goldberg (1917–2006), American NFL All-Pro football halfback (Chicago Cardinals)

Writers and journalists
Anatol Goldberg (1910–1982), Soviet-British head of the BBC Russian Service during the Cold War
Ben Zion Goldberg (1895–1972), Belarusian-American Yiddish journalist
 Bernard Goldberg (born 1945), American writer, journalist, and political commentator and author
 Itche Goldberg (1904–2006), American-Yiddish writer and publisher
 J.J. Goldberg (born 1949), American writer and editor
 Jeffrey Goldberg (born 1965), American author and journalist
 Joshua Ryne Goldberg (born 1995), American convicted felon, Jewish Neo-Nazi and internet troll
 Kaarina Goldberg (born 1956), Finnish author and journalist
 Leah Goldberg (1911–1970), Israeli poet and writer
 Miriam Goldberg (1916–2017), American newspaper publisher and editor
 Steven Goldberg (born 1941), American academic and author

Other
 Aharon Goldberg, Israeli rabbi convicted of conspiracy to commit kidnapping and murder-for-hire
 Alan Goldberg (architect), American architect
 Alan E. Goldberg (born 1949), American Thoroughbred horse racing trainer
 Arthur A. Goldberg (born 1940), American businessman, co-founder and co-director of Jews Offering New Alternatives for Healing
 Bertrand Goldberg (1913–1997), American architect and industrial designer
 Billy Goldberg (born 1966),American physician, New York City emergency medicine physician
 Carin Goldberg (1953-2023), American graphic artist
 Dave Goldberg (1967–2015), American Internet entrepreneur
 David Theo Goldberg (born 1952), South African philosopher, director of the University of California Humanities Research Institute
 Denis Goldberg (1933–2020), South African anti-apartheid activist
 Eric Goldberg (artist) (1890–1969), Canadian painter
 Ian Goldberg (born 1973), Canadian cryptographer
 Jonah Goldberg (born 1969), American conservative pundit
 Joshua L. Goldberg (1896–1994), Belarusian-born American rabbi
 Lucianne Goldberg (born 1935), American literary agent who was an important figure in the Monica Lewinsky scandal
 Max Goldberg, owner of YTMND
 Merle S. Goldberg (1936–1998), American abortion activist
 Michael Goldberg (1924–2007), American abstract expressionist painter and teacher
 Richard Steve Goldberg (born 1945), American convicted child pornographer
 Rube Goldberg (1883–1970), American cartoonist and inventor of the eponymous machines
 Suzanne Goldberg (1940–1999), New Zealand painter
 Thorsten Goldberg (born 1960), German multimedia artist
 Werner Goldberg (1919–2004), half-Jewish German (mischling) soldier and politician who was depicted in a German newspaper during World War II as "The Ideal German Soldier"
 William Goldberg (diamond dealer) (1925–2003), American diamond dealer

Fictional characters
 Edward Goldberg, in the animated series Drawn Together
 Greg Goldberg, from the Mighty Ducks movies
 Joe Goldberg, main protagonist of the You book series by Caroline Kepnes, as well as the television series of the same name

See also 
 David Goldberg (disambiguation)
Michael Goldberg (disambiguation)
 Goldberg (disambiguation)
 Golberg (disambiguation)
 Goldberger
 Goldenberg
 Harpaz

References

German-language surnames
Ashkenazi surnames
Yiddish-language surnames
Surnames from ornamental names